Countdown to Nowhere is the fourth full-length studio album from Allister, a pop punk band from Chicago, Illinois, released in Japan on June 16, 2010 and in the U.S. on October 5, 2010.  It was the band's first full-length album released in five years, and their first album released after the conclusion of their three-year hiatus.

A music video for the song "Free" was released on April 23, 2010, followed by a music video for "Runaway" on June 2, 2010.

Track listing

References

2010 albums
Allister albums
Universal Music Japan albums